The National Chemical Laboratory (NCL) is an Indian government laboratory based in Pune, in western India.

Popularly known as NCL, a constituent member of the Council of Scientific & Industrial Research (CSIR) India, it was established in 1950. Dr Ashish Lele is the Director of NCL and took charge on April 1, 2021. There are approximately 200 scientific staff working here. The interdisciplinary research center has a wide research scope and specializes in polymer science, organic chemistry, catalysis, materials chemistry, chemical engineering, biochemical sciences and process development. It houses good infrastructure for measurement science and chemical information.

National Collection of Industrial Microorganisms (NCIM) is located here and is a microbial culture repository maintaining a variety of industrially important microbial culture stock.

There are about 400 graduate students pursuing research towards doctoral degree; about 50 students are awarded Ph.D. degree every year; and the young talent pool adds in every few years.

NCL publishes over 400 research papers annually in the field of chemical sciences and over 60 patents worldwide. It is a unique source of research education producing the largest number of PhDs in chemical sciences within India.

Research Groups in NCL

Physical & Materials Chemistry 
Catalysis & Inorganic Chemistry
Chemical biology & Biometic Chemistry
Chemical Engineering Science
Complex Fluidics & Polymer Engineering
Heterogeneous and Homogeneous Catalysis
Industrial Flow Modelling
Materials Chemistry
Nanomaterials Science & Technology
Organic Chemistry
Plant Tissue Culture
Polymer Chemistry & Materials
Process Design & Development
Theory & Computational Sciences
Enzymology and Microbiology
Catalytic Reactors and Separation
Polymer Science & Engineering 
Biology Division
Digital Information & Resource Centre (DIRC)

Facilities

PES Modern English School
NCL has a primary and secondary school within its premises. Established in 1985 as the NCL School, it has since been renamed the 'Progressive Education Society's Modern English School'. Since 2006 it has been extended to include a junior college.

Dispensary
NCL also has a Dispensary inside its premises which provides free of charge medical assistance to NCL employees and dependants under the CGHS.

Past directors 
The organization was headed by many notable scientists since inception.

 James William McBain (1950-1952)
 G. I. Finch (1952-1957)
 K. Venkataraman (1957-1966)
 B. D. Tilak (1966-1978)
 L. K. Doraiswamy (1978-1989)
 Raghunath Anant Mashelkar (1989-1995)
 Paul Ratnasamy (1995-2002)
 Swaminathan Sivaram (2002-2010)
 Sourav Pal (2010-2015)
 K. Vijayamohanan Pillai (2015-2016)
 Ashwini Nangia (2016-2020)
 S.Chandrasekhar (2020-2021)

Notable alumni 
 Dr Kallam Anji Reddy founder of Dr Reddy Labs.
B D Kulkarni: Known for work on fluidized bed reactor.

References

External links
 
 National Collection of Industrial Microorganisms
 Dr. Ashish Lele takes charge of NCL

Organisations based in Pune
Research institutes in Pune
Chemical research institutes
Council of Scientific and Industrial Research
Chemical industry of India
1950 establishments in Bombay State
Government agencies established in 1950